David Thomas Gwynne-Vaughan FRSE FLS MRIA (12 March 1871 – 4 September 1915) was a 20th-century Welsh botanist and botanopalaeolontologist, specialising in fossilised plants (especially ferns).

Life

He was born on 12 March 1871 at Royston House in Llandovery in Wales, the eldest son of Henry Thomas Gwynne-Vaughan of Cynghordy, and his wife, Elizabeth Thomas. His mother died in 1874 when he was still very young. He was educated at Monmouth School then studied Natural Sciences at Christ's College, Cambridge, graduating in 1893. He then worked for some time at the Jodrell Laboratory in Kew.

Academic career
After a period of his life, traveling overseas visiting exotic locations with a group of young British academics and adventures, among them his second-cousin "Gwyn" Sir Gwynneth de Candia Vaughan son of Arthur Powys-Vaughan and countess Clelia de Candia, daughter of the famous count Mario the Tenor, David spent the year of 1896 in the Amazon rainforest and in the summer of 1897 he took a study trip to Siam and Malaysia. Along these overseas trips, he acquired extensive botanical data and regional information that eventually became vital to write the research papers that granted him a successful lecturing career, taking postings in renown universities:

 From 1896, Assistant Lecturer in botany, at Queen Margaret College in Glasgow;  
 In 1905, Assistant Lecturer transferred to Birkbeck College, and moved to London; 
 Then, Professorship at Queen's College, Belfast.
 From 1906 to 1908, he won the Society's Makdougall-Brisbane Prize for the period .
 In 1910, he was elected a Fellow of the Royal Society of Edinburgh. His proposers were Frederick Orpen Bower, Sir Isaac Bayley Balfour, Robert Kidston and John Horne. 
 In 1914, transferred Professorship to Reading University, moving from Belfast to Reading, Berkshire.

He died in Reading of tuberculosis on 4 September 1915.

Publications
 The Anatomy of Pteridophyta
 Observations on the Anatomy of Solenostelic Ferns (1901)
 On the Fossil Osmundacae (1907)

Family
In 1911 he married Helen Charlotte Isabella Fraser (who he met at Birkbeck College) and who was famed in her own right as Dame Helen Gwynne-Vaughan. They had no children.

References

1871 births
1915 deaths
Academics of the University of Reading
Fellows of the Linnean Society of London
Fellows of the Royal Society of Edinburgh
Welsh palaeontologists
Welsh botanists
20th-century deaths from tuberculosis
Tuberculosis deaths in England